Lucas Ramón Alessandría (born 5 April 1978) is an Argentine football defender currently playing for Unión de Santa Fe in Argentina. He has played club football for several clubs in Argentina and Spain.

Alessandría started his professional career with Club Atlético Lanús in 1997. He played for the club until 2003 when he spent a season with CD Leganés in Spain. Alessandría returned to Lanús in 2004, during his two spells with the club he amassed nearly 200 appearances, scoring 4 goals.

In 2005 Alessandría joined Quilmes but left after only one season to return to Spanish football where he joined Ponferradina in 2006.

In 2007 Alessandría joined newly promoted Tigre for the Apertura 2007 which was Tigre's first season in the Primera since 1980. The club finished in 2nd place which was the highest league finish in their history.

External links
 Football-Lineups player profile
 Tigre player profile

1978 births
Living people
People from Rafaela
Sportspeople from Santa Fe Province
Argentine footballers
Association football defenders
Club Atlético Lanús footballers
Quilmes Atlético Club footballers
CD Leganés players
SD Ponferradina players
Club Atlético Tigre footballers
Unión de Santa Fe footballers
Argentine Primera División players
9 de Julio de Rafaela players